Baldur's Gate III is an upcoming role-playing video game developed and published by Larian Studios. It is the third main game in the Baldur's Gate series, which is itself based on the Dungeons & Dragons tabletop role-playing system. A partial version of the game was released in early access format for Windows, macOS, and the Stadia streaming service, on 6 October 2020. The game is expected to remain in early access until its full release on August 31, 2023, which would coincide with the PlayStation 5 release. The Xbox Series X/S port is also in development, while Stadia version was cancelled following the service's closure.

Gameplay
Baldur's Gate III is a role-playing video game that offers both a single-player and cooperative multiplayer element. Players can create one or more characters and form a party along with computer-generated characters to explore the game's story. Optionally, players will be able to take one of their characters and team up online with other players to form a party. Unlike previous games in the Baldur's Gate series, Baldur's Gate III has turn-based combat, similar to Larian's earlier games Divinity: Original Sin and Divinity: Original Sin II; but this time it is based on the D&D 5th Edition rules.

Plot
In the year 1492 DR, over 120 years after the events of Baldur's Gate II: Shadows of Amn and months after the events of Baldur's Gate: Descent into Avernus, the forces of darkness are on the rise. The player character (named by the player) has been taken captive by the mind flayers, who have launched an invasion of Faerûn. They have implanted the protagonist, as well as a host of other creatures, with illithid tadpoles, parasites capable of enthralling and transforming them into another mind flayer. Before the mind flayers can transform their victims, the nautiloid flying ship they are all aboard comes under attack from githyanki warriors and their red dragons and flees through multiple realms, including Avernus, the first of the Nine Hells. The protagonist is freed during the fighting and steers the damaged ship back to Faerûn, where it crashes. As the protagonist searches for a way to remove their parasite, they encounter other survivors of the wreck: the human wizard Gale, the half-elf cleric Shadowheart, the high elf vampire rogue Astarion, the human warlock Wyll, and the githyanki fighter Lae'zel.

Development

The original Baldur's Gate game was developed by BioWare and Black Isle Studios, and published by Interplay Entertainment in 1998. The game used a licensed version of the Dungeons & Dragons (D&D) rule set, specifically in the Forgotten Realms setting. The game's success led to a sequel, Baldur's Gate II: Shadows of Amn, and its expansion pack, as well as Icewind Dale and its sequel, and finally, Planescape: Torment. Black Isle Studios began work on a further sequel, Baldur's Gate III: The Black Hound, in 2003, but Interplay faced significant financial crisis that year and shut down Black Isle, cancelling the game. Interplay lost the license to make D&D video games to Atari in 2008. Atari later released Neverwinter Nights and its sequel, Neverwinter Nights 2. Wizards of the Coast had long since acquired the rights to D&D as part of their purchase of TSR, and had been making updates to the core rule sets over the previous years. The new sequel from Larian Studios has no connection to the cancelled Baldur's Gate III: The Black Hound.

The series' intellectual property (IP) had been sought after by multiple developers. This includes Brian Fargo, the  founder of both Interplay and inXile Entertainment, as well as Feargus Urquhart of Obsidian Entertainment, who were seeking the IP rights for at least a decade. Larian Studios was interested in making a sequel in the Baldur's Gate series for some time, having first approached Wizards of the Coast after their release of Divinity: Original Sin around 2014. At this time, Wizards of the Coast felt the studio was still too new to the industry to be trusted with the Baldur's Gate license. Larian then developed Divinity: Original Sin II, which was released in September 2017. Pre-release materials related to the game impressed Wizards of the Coast, so they contacted Larian to ask if they still had interest in Baldur's Gate III. Larian accepted, and while working to wrap up the release stage of development for Divinity: Original Sin II, a small group gathered to develop the design document to present to Wizards of the Coast with their ideas for the new Baldur's Gate.

The game will be based on the 5th-edition Dungeons & Dragons rule set, though it will include tweaks and modifications that Larian found necessary in translating it to a video game. For example, the combat system is expected to be weighed more in favor of the player than in the tabletop version, to make the game more enjoyable.

Larian Studios teased Baldur's Gate III in the week prior to E3 2019. They formally revealed it during Google's presentation on the Stadia platform just ahead of E3, confirming its release for both Windows and Stadia. The tabletop adventure Baldur's Gate: Descent Into Avernus was published by Wizards of the Coast in September 2019, and has been described as a "prequel" to Baldur's Gate III. The Descent into Avernus adventure takes place roughly 100 years after the events of Baldur's Gate II, and the story of Baldur's Gate III takes place immediately following the events of the Descent into Avernus tabletop module. On 5 October 2020, Larian Studios announced the game would be released for macOS in addition to Windows and Stadia.

Baldur's Gate III was originally set to be released in early access on 30 September 2020. This date was later delayed to 6 October 2020. The early access version contained only the first act of the game, amounting to approximately 25 hours of content and one-fifth of the game world's map. The character creator also initially included a selection of 16 races and six classes to choose from, with more planned for the finalized release. Additional features and content, including multiplayer functionality and more classes, were gradually added to the early access version through patches as development progressed towards the final release. Save files created during early access will not be transferable to the completed game.

The game is expected to remain in early access until August 2023. Following Stadia's closure on 18 January 2023, the full version for Stadia was cancelled. On February 23, 2023, it was announced that Baldur's Gate III will be fully released on August 31, 2023 for macOS, Windows, and PlayStation 5. An Xbox Series X and Series S port was also confirmed by Larian to be in development, but was not officially announced as it ran into technical issues with split-screen co-op. Larian also mentioned that the game is not a PlayStation console exclusive and might get released on Xbox should the issues get fixed.

Reception 
On the day of its early access launch, Baldur's Gate III became the best-selling game on both Steam and GOG.com. On Steam, the game peaked at over 70,000 concurrent players, indicating strong initial sales. Larian Studios stated that heavy demand for the game appeared to cause technical issues for Steam in the minutes after the launch.

References

External links

3
Cancelled Stadia games
Early access video games
macOS games
Multiplayer and single-player video games
PlayStation 5 games
Role-playing video games
Upcoming video games scheduled for 2023
Video game sequels
Video games developed in Belgium
Video games featuring protagonists of selectable gender
Windows games
Wizards of the Coast games
Xbox Series X and Series S games